Melba Liston and Her 'Bones is the sole album led by trombonist, arranger and composer Melba Liston, recorded for the MetroJazz label in 1958.

Reception 

The All About Jazz review by Hrayr Attarian states: "Melba Liston is best known as an arranger and composer, thanks to her associations with Dizzy Gillespie and subsequently Randy Weston. But she was a virtuoso trombone player as well. ... The leader's interplay with the other trombone players adds to the musical richness of the recording. Even in the company of high-quality, accomplished master musicians like these, her musical skills stand out. Her lyrical improvisations are melodic, clear and gay when she plays unmuted, and mysterious and warm when muted. This recording is one of the few places to hear Melba Liston solo".

Track listing
 "Blues Melba"  (Melba Liston) – 6:33
 "The Trolley Song" (Hugh Martin, Ralph Blane) – 2:30
 "Pow!"  (Leonard Feather) – 4:04
 "Wonder Why" (Nicholas Brodszky, Sammy Cahn) – 4:03
 "Christmas Eve"  (Slide Hampton) – 5:00
 "What's My Line Theme" (Granville 'Sascha' Burland) – 4:24
 "You Don't Say"  (Melba Liston) – 3:57
 "The Dark Before the Dawn"  (Hampton, Feather) – 3:23

Personnel
Melba Liston – trombone, arranger
Jimmy Cleveland (tracks 3-6 & 8), Bennie Green (tracks 1, 2 & 7), Al Grey (tracks 1, 2 & 7), Benny Powell (tracks 1, 2 & 7), Frank Rehak (tracks 3-6 & 8) – trombone
Slide Hampton – trombone, tuba, arranger (tracks 3-6 & 8) 
Ray Bryant – piano (tracks 3-6 & 8) 
Kenny Burrell – guitar (tracks 1, 2 & 7)
Jamil Nasser (tracks 1, 2 & 7), George Tucker (tracks 3-6 & 8) – bass
Frankie Dunlop (tracks 3-6 & 8), Charlie Persip (tracks 1, 2 & 8) – drums

References

1959 albums
Melba Liston albums
MetroJazz Records albums
Albums arranged by Melba Liston
Albums arranged by Slide Hampton